BLL may refer to:

Places
Bardon Mill railway station (station code  BLL ), Bardon Mill, Northumberland, England, UK
Billund Airport (IATA airport code  BLL )
Bloemendaal railway station (station code  Bll ); see Railway stations in the Netherlands

Groups, companies, organizations
Ball Corporation (NYSE ticker symbol  BLL )
Baltic Airlines (ICAO airline code  BLL ); see List of airline codes (B)
Box Lacrosse League

Other uses
Bachelor of Laws (B.LL)
Blood lead level
Business logic layer

See also

 
 
 
 BII (disambiguation)
 B11 (disambiguation)
 BL2 (disambiguation)
 BL (disambiguation)